Andrew Thomas Blades, (born 4 June 1967), was a rugby union player for Australia from 1992 to 1999.  Andrew was first chosen for the Wallabies match 22 in 1992 against the All Blacks but did not get on the field. Later that year he toured with the Wallabies to South Africa and the United Kingdom playing in non-test matches. His first Test Cap was not achieved until 1996 against Scotland. His last game for Australia was their victory over France in final of the 1999 Rugby World Cup. After retiring from playing he became a coach, leading the Newcastle Falcons for two years before becoming the forwards coach for the Wallabies.

His brother Cameron, was also an Australian rugby union representative player.

References

Australian rugby union players
Australia international rugby union players
Living people
1967 births
Australian rugby union coaches
Rugby union players from Sydney